Robert J. Dieter (born 1946) is an American lawyer and diplomat who was the United States Ambassador to Belize from 2005 to 2009.

Biography
Dieter graduated from the Phillips Academy and then attended Yale University as the roommate of future President George W. Bush. He graduated from Yale with a B.A. in 1968 and then continued his education at the Vanderbilt University Law School. Dieter earned his J.D. degree from the University of Denver Sturm College of Law in 1972. He taught at the University of Colorado Boulder.

In 2003, President Bush appointed Dieter to the board of the Legal Services Corporation. In 2005, he was sworn in as Ambassador to Belize.

On October 30, 1971, Dieter married Gwynneth Ann Fletcher Evans in St. James, Long Island, New York.

References

External links
U.S Department of State - Robert J. Dieter

1946 births
Living people
People from New Orleans
Phillips Academy alumni
Yale University alumni
Sturm College of Law alumni
Colorado lawyers
University of Colorado Boulder faculty
Ambassadors of the United States to Belize